Nerve center can refer to:
 Nerve Centre - a youth self-help organisation
 Nerve centre - a concept in the theory of the reflex activity of the central nervous system

See also 
 The principle of the dominant formulated by Alexei Alexeyevich Ukhtomsky (ru)